War on Peace: The End of Diplomacy and the Decline of American Influence is a 2018 book by American journalist Ronan Farrow, published on April 24, 2018 by W. W. Norton & Company.

Reception
Publishers Weekly wrote, "Farrow doesn't quite demonstrate how diplomacy would succeed in quagmires like Afghanistan, but his indictment of the militarization of American foreign policy is persuasive."

Rosa Brooks, reviewing the book for The Washington Post, said:
Although “War on Peace” doesn’t fully achieve its broadest ambitions, it offers lively writing, astute commentary and plenty of great stories, laced through with passion and outrage.

See also
 Not for the Faint of Heart: Lessons in Courage, Power and Persistence
 The Pragmatic Entente: Israeli-Iranian Relations, 1948-1988

References

2018 non-fiction books
W. W. Norton & Company books
English-language books
American non-fiction books
Non-fiction books about diplomacy